Reticular nucleus may refer to:

 Caudal pontine reticular nucleus
 Gigantocellular reticular nucleus, a nucleus that innervates the caudal hypoglossal nucleus, and responds to glutamateric stimuli.
 Lateral reticular nucleus
 Oral pontine reticular nucleus
 Paramedian reticular nucleus, a nucleus that mediate the horizontal eye movements on their ipsilateral sides
 Parvocellular reticular nucleus, part of the brain located dorsolateral to the caudal pontine reticular nucleus
 Tegmental pontine reticular nucleus, an area within the floor of the midbrain
 Thalamic reticular nucleus, part of the ventral thalamus that forms a capsule around the thalamus laterally
 Ventral reticular nucleus, a continuation of the parvocellular nucleus in the brainstem